Hilltop High School (formerly Hilltop Senior High) is a four-year public high school located in Chula Vista, California and is part of the Sweetwater Union High School District (SUHSD). The school colors are kelly green, white, and black. The school mascot is the "Lancer". Hilltop boasts the magnet program Foreign Language and Global Studies (FLAGS) as well as the Academies of Hospitality and Tourism (H&T), Information Technology (IT) programs, Advancement Via Individual Determination (AVID), Music Technology, Televideo, and Ballet Folklorico.

For the 2007–08 school year, former Montgomery Middle School principal Ernesto Zamudio took over as principal for Hilltop High School and replaced the retiring Jerry Rindone. As of 2020, Karen Hernandez is the principal of Hilltop High. who had served Hilltop since 1997. Rindone is currently serving as a member of the San Diego County Board of Education

Clubs and associations
Hilltop has many clubs and associations, including AP Scholars, the BIBLE Club, Best Buddies, The HOOLIGANS (Pep Club), Girl's League, Humanities, MVPS,  GSA, Metal (Music), Marine Science, Italian, German, Spanish, Latin, Students Against Destructive Decisions (SADD), FIRST Robotics, Interact, Chips and Salsa, and Chess and Cards.

Academics
Hilltop was named a California Distinguished School in 2005 and is accredited by the Western Association of Schools and Colleges (WASC).

In the 2006–07 school year, the graduation rate was 93.3%.

Hilltop has the highest number of AP courses available to all students and the highest AP pass rate out of the entire SUHSD at 72.8%.  Since the 1999–2000 school year, there has been a 25% increase in exams taken, a 7% increase in the overall pass rate, and a 30% increase in the total number of students testing.

Athletics
Hilltop is a member of the California Interscholastic Federation (CIF) San Diego Section and the Mesa League of the Metro Conference.  Hilltop competes in the following sports:
Fall: cross country, football, women's volleyball, boys water polo, women's tennis, women's golf, field hockey
Winter: basketball, soccer, wrestling, cheerleading, Roller Hockey, women’s water polo
Spring: track and field, men's volleyball, lacrosse, softball, baseball, swimming and diving, men's tennis, men's golf, lacrosse

CIF Champions 

2016- Women’s Water Polo

Chula Vista Spartans are the Lancers longtime rival school, dating back to the '60s.

Longtime Hilltop Coaches elected as San Diego Sports Hall of Champions Coaching Legends:
Don "Big Dawg" Rollins- JV Basketball (Don is currently third all time in Southern California JV wins)
John Baumgartner - Baseball
Janet Balsley - Field Hockey
Chip Holmes - Track & Field
Tim Tyler - Wrestling (Tyler was also inducted into the National Wrestling Hall of Fame)

Demographics
In the 2005–06 school year, the school's Academic Performance Index place it 698 (base) where 800 is the California state goal with a state rank 5 out of 10.

Notable alumni

Notable faculty
Rene Ortiz, former soccer player
Dean Lister, multiple time Brazilian Jiu-Jitsu champion

References

External links
 
 Hilltop High legacy (archived) web site)

Educational institutions established in 1959
High schools in San Diego County, California
Public high schools in California
Education in Chula Vista, California
1959 establishments in California